Matt or Matthew McCoy may refer to:
 Matt McCoy (actor) (born 1958), American actor
 Matt McCoy (American football) (born 1982), American football linebacker
 Matt McCoy (politician) (born 1966), Iowa State Senator
 Matt McCoy (worship leader), songwriter, worship leader and Christian musician
 Matt McCoy (rugby league) (1923–2007), Australian rugby league footballer
 Matthew McCoy (Magistrate) (1819–1853), Magistrate of the British Overseas Territory of Pitcairn Island, 1843 and 1853
 Matthew Edmond McCoy (1868–1929), Magistrate of the British Overseas Territory of Pitcairn Island, 1909